Aksaysky (masculine), Aksayskaya (feminine), or Aksayskoye (neuter) may refer to:
Aksaysky District, a district of Rostov Oblast, Russia
Aksayskoye Urban Settlement, an administrative division and a municipal formation which the town of Aksay in Askaysky District of Rostov Oblast, Russia is incorporated as